"My Apocalypse" is a song by American heavy metal band Metallica, and the second single from their studio album Death Magnetic. On August 26, 2008, it was made available for streaming on the band's official website, as well as a download (for Platinum Members only) on the Death Magnetic website Mission: Metallica. The song was later released as a digital single in the iTunes Store.

The band first performed this song in Birmingham, UK, on March 25, 2009, during their World Magnetic Tour. "'My Apocalypse' was a cool song," remarked bassist Robert Trujillo. "It was fast; it had the thrash element of the past." The name of its parent album is derived from its lyric, "Death magnetic, pulling closer still."

At the 2009 Grammy Awards, the single won the "Best Metal Performance" category.

More recently, a new introduction to the song was added. Lars Ulrich said, "We've been enjoying playing 'My Apocalypse' out here on the road but felt like it could use something extra. We decided that it needed a cool intro to set the mood so James wrote one."

At 5 minutes and 1 second long, "My Apocalypse" is the shortest song on Death Magnetic.

Track listing

Charts

Personnel
Metallica
 James Hetfield – vocals, rhythm guitar
 Lars Ulrich – drums
 Kirk Hammett – lead guitar 
 Robert Trujillo – bass

Production
 Rick Rubin – producer
 Ted Jensen – mastering
 Greg Fidelman – mixing

References

2008 singles
Metallica songs
Songs written by James Hetfield
Songs written by Lars Ulrich
Songs written by Kirk Hammett
Songs written by Robert Trujillo
Song recordings produced by Rick Rubin
Grammy Award for Best Metal Performance
2008 songs
Warner Records singles